This is a list of episodes of the anime series Dramatical Murder. The anime was announced to air in summer 2014. The anime aired on July 6, 2014, and was streamed on Crunchyroll. The series has seven musical themes: one opening and six ending themes. "SLIP ON THE PUMPS" by GOATBED is the main opening theme while "BOWIE KNIFE", also performed by GOATBED, is the ending theme used in episodes 1 to 6, and 11. From episode 7 to 10 and 12, each episode's ending theme differed and was sung by the artists that performed the ending themes for DRAMAtical Murder re:connect for the characters' respective episodes. "BY MY SIDE" and "Lullaby Blue" by Kanako Itō was used for episodes 7 and 9, respectively. "Felt" by Seiji Kimura was used for episode 8, and "Soul Grace" by VERTUEUX for episode 10. For the last episode, "" by GOATBED was used.

A DVD/Blu-ray was released on December 24, 2014 with all twelve episodes. Along with an original soundtrack and a drama CD titled , a special OVA called Data_xx_Transitory, which features the bad endings of the game, was included. On September 21, 2014, following the airing of the final episode, the official anime website announced that there will be a live reading event on February 1, 2015 titled Data_12.5_Recitation. Atsushi Kisaichi, Ryōta Takeuchi, Hiroki Takahashi, Satoshi Hino, Kenichiro Matsuda, Masatomo Nakazawa, and Yūichi Iguchi have been confirmed to be attending.

On June 21, 2015, Madman Entertainment announced at the Supanova Pop Culture Expo that it has licensed the series for Australian and New Zealand release. On July 16, 2015, Sentai Filmworks announced the license to the series for North American release in English on DVD and Blu-ray on November 24, 2015.

Episode list

References

Dramatical Murder